Rona Jean Murray (born February 10, 1924 London, England - died July 9, 2003 Victoria, British Columbia, Canada) was a Canadian poet.

Life
Murray spent her early childhood in India where her father commanded a Gurkha regiment. When she was eight years old her family immigrated to Canada in 1932.

Rona attended Queen Margaret's School from 1932 to 1941. She studied at Mills College, and later graduated from the University of British Columbia and the University of Kent, where she earned a Ph.D.

She taught at Douglas College, Selkirk College, Castlegar, University of Victoria, and University of British Columbia.

In 1944 Murray married Gerry Haddon and had 3 children; they divorced.  She later married ceramics artist Walter Dexter. They lived on Vancouver Island.

Her papers are held at University of Victoria.

Awards
Rona Murray has been granted the following awards,
 1984 Ethel Wilson B.C. Fiction Award, Shortlisted, for The Indigo Dress and Other Stories
 1982 Pat Lowther Award for Journey
 1965 Norma Epstein National Award for Creative Writing, for The Enchanted Adder
 1964 Macmillan of Canada Creative Writing Award, for The Enchanted Adder
 1958 B.C. Centennial One-Act Play Award, for Blue Duck's Feather and Eagledown

Works

Poetry
 The Enchanted Adder (1965)

Plays
 Blue Duck's Feather and Eagledown was performed in the 1958 Centennial celebrations of British Columbia,

Anthologies

Editor

Non Fiction
 The Art of Earth, Rona Murray and Walter Dexter.

References

External links
 Biographical Note, Alan Twigg, ABC Bookworld

1924 births
2003 deaths
Canadian women poets
University of British Columbia alumni
Academic staff of the University of Victoria
Academic staff of the University of British Columbia
Alumni of the University of Kent
20th-century Canadian poets
English emigrants to Canada
20th-century Canadian women writers